The 2016 Campeonato Paraense de Futebol was the 104th edition of Pará's top professional football league. The competition started on 30 January and ended on 8 May. Paysandu won the championship for the 46th time.

Format
The clubs play each other within their group, with two from each group qualifying for the semi-finals of the first round. In the second round the clubs play against clubs from the other group, with two from each group qualifying for the semi-finals of the second round. If each stage has a separate winner there will be a match between the winners of each round to see who will be the champion.

The worst two teams are relegated to Second Division.

The champion qualify to the 2017 Copa Verde. The champion, the runner-up and the 3rd-placed team qualify to the 2017 Copa do Brasil. The best team who isn't on Campeonato Brasileiro Série A, Série B or Série C qualifies to Série D.

Participating teams

First round

Group A1

Group A2

Semifinals

Final

Paysandu won the first round of Campeonato Paraense.

Second round

Group A

Group B

Results

Semifinals

Final

São Francisco won the second round of Campeonato Paraense.

Final

References

Para
Campeonato Paraense